The 1976 Richmond Spiders football team was an American football team that represented the University of Richmond as an independent during the 1976 NCAA Division I football season. In their third season under head coach Jim Tait, Richmond compiled a 5–6 record.

Schedule

References

Richmond
Richmond Spiders football seasons
Richmond Spiders